Girolamo Santacroce (c. 1502 – c. 1537) was a 16th-century Italian sculptor and medalist of the Renaissance period, active mainly in Naples.

References

Renaissance sculptors
Year of birth uncertain
1530s deaths
16th-century Italian sculptors
Italian male sculptors